Raccordo autostradale 9 di Benevento (RA 9) is a motorway that connects the A16 Napoli-Canosa to the city of Benevento, for a development of just over 12 kilometers.

References 

RA09
Transport in Campania